Kiran Devi Yadav (born 1974) is an Indian politician and a member of Bihar Legislative Assembly. She is representing the Sandesh constituency in Bhojpur district of Bihar and was elected in 2020 as a member of Rashtriya Janata Dal (RJD)

Family
Kiran Devi Yadav is married to Arun Kumar Yadav who is also a former MLA of Sandesh constituency from 2015 to 2020.

She defeated Arun Yadav's elder brother Vijendra Kumar Yadav in the 2020 Bihar Legislative Assembly election from Sandesh.

References

Indian politicians
1974 births
Living people
Bihar MLAs 2020–2025
Women members of the Bihar Legislative Assembly
People from Bhojpur district, India
21st-century Indian women politicians